The World Group Play-offs for the 1991 Federation Cup was held from 24–26 July at the Nottingham Tennis Centre in Nottingham, United Kingdom, on hard courts.

The sixteen teams that were defeated in the first round of the World Group played off in the first round. Those that lost again would then play off again in the Repechage Round; with the four teams that lost again being relegated to Zonal Competition in 1992.

Draw

First round

Brazil vs. Argentina

Sweden vs. Paraguay

Romania vs. Portugal

Netherlands vs. Hungary

Denmark vs. Greece

Israel vs. New Zealand

Japan vs. Belgium

France vs. Yugoslavia

Repechage Round

Brazil vs. Paraguay

Portugal vs. Hungary

Greece vs. New Zealand

Belgium vs. Yugoslavia

References

External links
 Fed Cup website

World Group Play-offs